Albert Montañés was the defending champion, but lost to compatriot Pablo Andújar in the second round.

None of the 8 seeded players reached quarter-finals. Andújar reached the final, where he faced Juan Carlos Ferrero. His 5 years older compatriot defeated him 6–4, 6–0 and claimed the title.

Seeds

Main draw

Finals

Top half

Bottom half

Qualifying draw

Seeds

Qualifiers

Lucky losers
  Bastian Knittel

First qualifier

Second qualifier

Third qualifier

Fourth qualifier

References

External links
 Main draw
 Qualifying draw

Stuttgart Singles
Singles 2011